The Masters (also known as the Cazoo Masters for sponsorship purposes) is a non-ranking PDC darts tournament which features the top 24 darts players according to the PDC Order of Merit as of 2021.

History
The inaugural tournament, held in 2013, was won by Phil Taylor, who defeated Adrian Lewis 10–1 in the final. James Wade won the following year by defeating Mervyn King 11–10 in the 2014 final. Michael van Gerwen became the third different champion in 3 years when he defeated Raymond van Barneveld 11–6. 

In 2013 and 2014, the tournament took place in the Royal Highland Centre in Edinburgh, Scotland and was played in early November. However, the tournament was moved to early February in 2015 and had a new venue at the Arena MK (renamed Marshall Arena in 2019) in Milton Keynes, England. The tournament has been held in late January/early February ever since.

Format
From 2013 to 2020, the tournament featured the top 16 of the Order of Merit, in a fixed draw (1 plays 16, 2 plays 15 and so on). The first round and the quarter finals are played over best of 19 legs, the semi-finals and the final are played over best of 21 legs.

For the 2021 tournament, the participants increased from the Top 16 to the Top 24, with the Top 8 automatically going to the second round and the players seeded 9 to 24 playing in the best of 11 legs first round.

Masters finals

Records and statistics

As of 2023, Michael van Gerwen, James Wade,  Peter Wright and Dave Chisnall are the only players to appear in all 11 editions of the Masters.

Total finalist appearances

 Active players are shown in bold
 Only players who reached the final are included
 In the event of identical records, players are sorted in alphabetical order by family name

Champions by country

High averages

Media coverage
The Masters is broadcast by ITV4 in the United Kingdom and RTL7 in the Netherlands.

References

External links
 Masters at Darts Database
 The Masters page on the PDC website

 
Professional Darts Corporation tournaments
Darts in the United Kingdom
Recurring sporting events established in 2013
2013 establishments in Scotland
Annual sporting events in the United Kingdom